The Asahan River is one of the principal rivers in North Sumatra, Indonesia, that begins in Porsea, Toba Samosir Regency at the Southeast part of Lake Toba.

Hydrology 
The river flows toward a north-easterly direction, cutting through the upper course of the deep valley in the Barisan Mountains in Toba Samosir Regency, then flows through the Asahan Regency and eventually empties into the Strait of Malacca

The largest city on the Asahan is Tanjungbalai, Asahan with a population of more than 150,000 people. The river houses the Sigura-gura Dam, which supplies power to the North Sumatran Province.

Tributaries of the Asahan include the Silang, Silau, Nantalu, Masihi, Lauran, and Baru River.

Geography 
The river flows along the northeast area of Sumatra with predominantly tropical rainforest climate (designated as Af in the Köppen-Geiger climate classification). The annual average temperature in the area is 23 °C. The warmest month is March, when the average temperature is around 25 °C, and the coldest is May, at 23 °C. The average annual rainfall is 2950 mm. The wettest month is November, with an average of 381 mm rainfall, and the driest is June, with 117 mm rainfall.

See also
List of rivers of Sumatra
List of rivers of Indonesia

References 

Lake Toba
Rivers of North Sumatra
Rivers of Indonesia